The rail network in the state of Haryana in India, is covered by 5 rail divisions under 3 rail zones: North Western Railway zone (Bikaner railway division and Jaipur railway division), Northern Railway zone (Delhi railway division and Ambala railway division) and North Central Railway zone (Agra railway division).

The Diamond Quadrilateral High-speed rail network Eastern Dedicated Freight Corridor and Western Dedicated Freight Corridor pass through Haryana.

History

Haryana railway history

19th Century
On 3 March 1859, Allahabad-Kanpur, the first passenger railway line in North India was opened, which falls under Northern Railway zone.

In 1864, train tracks passed through Haryana for the first time when a broad gauge track from Calcutta to Delhi was laid.  In 1866, through trains started running on the East Indian Railway Company's  Howrah-Delhi line.
 

In 1872, Sarai Rohilla railway station was established when the metre gauge railway line from Delhi to Jaipur and Ajmer was being laid. It was a small station just outside Delhi as Delhi was confined to walled city then. All the metre gauge trains starting from (and terminating at) Delhi to Rewari, Punjab, Rajasthan and Gujarat passed through this station. The track from Delhi to Sarai Rohilla was double. The single track from Sarai Rohilla to Rewari was doubled up to Rewari, from where single tracks diverged in five directions.

In 1876, metre gauge track from Delhi to Rewari and further to Ajmer was laid in 1873 by Rajputana State Railway.

In 1879, the Sind, Punjab and Delhi railway completed the  Amritsar–Ambala–Saharanpur–Ghaziabad line connecting Multan (now in Pakistan) with Delhi.

The line passed through Muktasar and Fazilka tehsils and provided direct connection through Samma Satta (now in Pakistan) to Karachi.

In 1891, the Delhi-Panipat-Ambala-Kalka line was opened.

In 1897, the Southern Punjab Railway Co. opened the Delhi-Bhatinda-Samasatta line in 1897. The line passed through Muktasar and Fazilka tehsils and provided direct connection through Samma Satta (now in Pakistan) to Karachi.

20th Century
In 1900, Jodhpur–Bikaner line combined with Jodhpur-Hyderabad Railway, some part of this railway is in Pakistan, leading to connection with Hyderabad of Sindh Province. In 1901–02, the Jodhpur–Bikaner line was extended to Bathinda in 1901–02 to connect it with the metre gauge section of the Bombay, Baroda and Central India Railway and the meter gauge of North Western Railway Delhi–Fazilka line via Hanumangarh.

In 1901-02, the metre gauge Jodhpur-Bikaner line was extended to Bathinda by Jodhpur-Bikaner Railway. It was subsequently converted to broad gauge.

The station building was renovated in 2012-13. Delhi earlier handled both broad and meter gauge trains. Since 1994, it is a purely broad gauge station, meter gauge traffic having been shifted to Delhi Sarai Rohilla Station.

In April 1919, Mahatma Gandhi was arrested from Palwal railway station on his way to Punjab to take part to the Non-Cooperation Movement meeting. There also a six-foot statue  of Mahatma Gandhi was installed in October 2013.

In 1926, New Delhi railway station opened. Before the new imperial capital New Delhi was established after 1911, the Old Delhi Railway Station served the entire city and the Agra-Delhi railway line cut through what is today called Lutyens' Delhi and the site earmarked for the hexagonal All-India War Memorial (now India Gate) and Kingsway (now Rajpath). The railway line was shifted along Yamuna river and opened in 1924 to make way for the new capital. Minto (now Shivaji) and Hardinge (now Tilak) rail bridges came up for this realigned line. The East Indian Railway Company, that overlooked railways in the region, sanctioned the construction of a single story building and a single platform between Ajmeri Gate and Paharganj in 1926. This was later known as New Delhi Railway station. The government's plans to have the new station built inside the Central Park of Connaught Place was rejected by the Railways as it found the idea impractical. The Viceroy and royal retinue entered the city through the new railway station during the inauguration of New Delhi in 1931. New structures were added to the railway station later and the original building served as the parcel office for many years.

In 1951, on 5 November the Jodhpur–Bikaner line was merged with the Western Railway. In 2002, on 1 October the North Western Railway zone came into existence.

On 14 April 1952,  Northern Railway zone was notified as a new railway zone by merging Jodhpur Railway, Bikaner Railway, Eastern Punjab Railway and three divisions of the East Indian Railway north-west of Mughalsarai (Uttar Pradesh).

In 1976-77, the Ghaziabad-Nizamuddin-New Delhi-Delhi track was electrified.

On 1 July 1987, Ambala railway division was created by transferring 639 km tracks from Delhi Division and 348 km from Firozpur Division, and it became completely operational from 15 August 1988. 62% its are lies Punjab and the rest in Haryana, Himachal Pradesh, Uttar Pradesh, Rajasthan and Chandigarh. It has 141 stations, including UNESCO World Heritage Kalka Shimla Railway.

In 1992-1995, Sabjimandi-Karnal sector was electrified.

In 1994 December, the Delhi-Rewari railway line had double metre gauge tracks and one of the tracks was converted to broad gauge as a part of conversion of Ajmer-Delhi line. Within a few years, both the tracks from Sarai Rohilla to Delhi railway station were converted to broad gauge and all metre gauge trains stopped operating from Delhi station.

In 1998-99, Ambala-Chandigarh sector was electrified.

In 1999-2000, Chandigarh-Kalka.

21st Century
On 1 April 2003, North Central Railway zone was created.

By September 2006, the second metre gauge track from Sarai Rohilla to Rewari was also converted to broad gauge and all metre gauge trains stopped operating between Rewari and Sarai Rohilla (though the converted track was opened for public use only in October 2007).

Between 2008 and 2011, the Bikaner–Rewari line was converted to broad gauge.

In 2009, the metre gauge Hisar-Sadulpur section was converted to broad gauge.

In 2010-11 Rail Budget, Panipat-Meerut line 104 km survey was announced and the project implementation was approved in 2017-18 budget with an outlay of INR948 crore.

In 2013, Chandigarh-Sahnewal line (also referred to as Ludhiana-Chandigarh rail link) was inaugurated.

In 2013, the foundation stone for the shifting of Rohtak-Makrauli section of Rohtak- Gohana- Panipat line was laid.

In 2013, the new broad gauge electrified Rewari-Rohtak line was constructed.

In 2016-17 Rail Budget, Yamunanagar-Chandigarh line re-survey for this INR875 crore line was announced at the cost of INR 25 crore.

By December 2017, railways for the first time installed 6,095 GPS-enabled "Fog Pilot Assistance System" railway signalling devices in four most affected zones, Northern Railway zone, North Central Railway zone, North Eastern Railway zone and North Western Railway zone, by doing away with the old practice of putting firecrackers on train tracks to alter train divers running trains on snail's pace. With these devices, train pilots precisely know in advance, about the location of signals, level-crossing gates and other such approaching markers.

In 2017-18, Indian Railway approved Panipat-Jind line and Panipat-Rohtak line electrification for Rs 980 crore and new rail line Panipat-Shamli-Baghpat-Meerut for Rs 2200 crore.

By December 2017, railways for the first time installed 6,095 GPS-enabled "Fog Pilot Assistance System" railway signalling devices in four most affected zones, Northern Railway zone, North Central Railway zone, North Eastern Railway zone and North Western Railway zone, by doing away with the old practice of putting firecrackers on train tracks to alert train drivers running trains on snail's pace. With these devices, train pilots precisely know in advance, about the location of signals, level-crossing gates and other such approaching markers.

Museums
 Rewari Railway Heritage Museum
 Ambala divisional railway museum
 Hisar sub-divisional railway museum

Network

Map and plans
Haryana Space Applications Centre, Hisar (HARSAC) has produced the railway map for Haryana and rail line under implementation are included in the current "pink book" of railway (see "external links").

Divisions and workshops
Rail network in Haryana falls under 5 divisions in 3 railway zones, each division has own workshops.

 North Western Railway zone
 Bikaner railway division of North Western Railway zone manages rail network in western and southern Haryana covering Bhatinda-Dabwali-Hanumangarh line, Rewari-Bhiwani-Hisar-Bathinda line, Hisar-Sadulpur line and Rewari-Kanina-Loharu-Sadulpur line. A category stations are Bhiwani and Hisar; B category stations is Sirsa; and D category stations are Ellenabad, Mandi Dabwali, Bhattu, Mandi adampur, Hansi, Loharu, Charkhi Dadri, Kanina, Mahendragagh, kosli; and E category station is Satrod. There are siding at Sirsa for FCI and Jharli for the Thermal power plant. Railway health units are Sirsa and Hisar with one doctor each, while Railway Divisional Hospital is at Lalgarh on outskirts of Bikaner.
 Jaipur railway division of North Western Railway zone manages rail network in south-west Haryana covering Rewari-Reengas-Jaipur line, Delhi-Alwar-Jaipur line and Loharu-Sikar line.
 Northern Railway zone 
 Delhi railway division of Northern Railway zone manages rail network in north and east and central Haryana covering Delhi-Panipat-Ambala line, Delhi-Rohtak-Tohana line, Rewari–Rohtak line, Jind-Sonepat line and Delhi-Rewari line.
 Ambala railway division of Northern Railway zone manages small part of rail network in north-east Haryana covering Ambala-Yamunanagar line, Ambala-Kurukshetra line and UNESCO World Heritage Kalka–Shimla Railway. There are 2 Workshops in this division which falls within Haryana: Carriage & Wagon Workshop, Jagadhari and Carriage & Wagon Workshop, Kalka for narrow gauge
 North Central Railway zone 
 Agra railway division of North Central Railway zone manages another very small part of network in south-east Haryana covering Palwal-Mathura line only.

Rail lines

Existing Rail lines
 North Western Railway zone 
 Bikaner railway division
 Bhatinda-Dabwali-Hanumangarh line
 Rewari-Bhiwani-Hisar-Bathinda line and Hisar-Sadulpur line
 Rewari-Kanina-Loharu-Sadulpur line
 Bhiwani-Rohtak line
 Hisar-Hansi-Rohtak line, under construction
 Hisar-Agroha line, surveyed and approved
 Hisar-Jind line, surveyed 
 Hansi-Narnaund-Jind line, being surveyed

 Jaipur railway division 
 Rewari-Reengas-Jaipur line
 Delhi-Alwar-Jaipur line 
 Loharu-Sikar line

 Northern Railway zone 
 Ambala railway division 
 Ambala-Yamunanagar line
 Ambala-Kurukshetra line 
 UNESCO World Heritage Kalka–Shimla Railway
 Chandigarh-Adi Badri-Paonta Sahib line, surveyed in 2012 
 Yamunanagar-Chandigarh line, new line being resurveyed

 Delhi railway division
 Delhi-Panipat-Ambala line
 Delhi-Rohtak-Tohana line
 Narwana-Kaithal-Kurukshetra line
 Rewari–Rohtak line 
 Jind-Sonepat line, via Gohana 
 Jind-Panipat line, via Safidon 
 Rohtak-Panipat line, via Gohana, being elevated 
 Delhi-Rewari line
 Panipat-Meerut line,survey completed

 North Central Railway zone 
 Agra railway division
 Palwal-Mathura line only

Future projects

Haryana current projects
Undertaken by IR and "Rail Infrastructure Development Company (Haryana) Limited" (H-RIDE, also called Haryana Rail Infrastructure Development Corporation).
 Announced projects (planned and/or being executed, c. Jan 2018) Feasibility study survey was completed for the first 7 projects in 10 months from 1 Jan to 31 Oct 2018.
 Karnal-Yamunanagar line, additional budget was allocated in 2019-20 union railway budget.
 Kaithal-Karnal- Meerut line
 Yamunanagar-Chandigarh via Naraingarh and Sadhaura 91 km link sent to planning commission in 2013 MoU was signed in 2015. It is included in 2018 pink book. Additional budget was allocated in 2019-20 union railway budget.

 Yamunanagar-Adi Badri-Paonta Sahib-Dehradun line, via Bilaspur, to connect to Chota Char Dham Railway is future proposed and yet unapproved and un-surveyed project
 Delhi-Sohna-Nuh-Ferozpur Zhirka-Alwar line 104 km link sent to planning commission in 2013 MoU was signed in 2015. It is included in 2018 pink book. Additional budget was allocated in 2019-20 union railway budget.
 Kaithal-Patiala line, survey was announced in 2016-17 budget and completed in January 2019, pending railway board approval for inclusion in the pinkbook as of Jan-2019.
 Bhiwani-Loharu line via Kairu-Jui MoU was signed in 2015 and H-RIDE will undertake Bhiwani-Loharu section to connect it to the existing Loharu-Pilani-Jhunjhunu railway link. Additional budget was allocated in 2019-20 union railway budget. Note, Jaipur-Reengas-Churu line was surveyed in 2015-2016.
 Narwana-Hisar line, 65 km, survey commenced in 2018, direct and shortest route via Narnaund
 Ukalana-Narwana line 29 km, previously announced connection for direct connectivity to Kurukshetra and Chandigarh
 Hansi-Jind line 45 km via Narnaund, previously announced complementary connection Additional budget was allocated for Jind-Hisar line in 2019-20 union railway budget.
 Farrukhnagar-Jhajjar-Charkhi Dadri line, 72 km, Bijwasan-Jhajjar-Charki Dadri was surveyed in 2010, and next stage survey commenced in 2018, Survey was conducted in 2015. Additional budget was allocated in 2019-20 union railway budget. Extend this along new Charkhi Dadri-Jui-Kairu-Isharwal-Jhunpa route. 
 Jhajjar-Palwal line 95 km including Jhajjar-Farukh Nagar new 30 km link and Patli-Sohna-Manesar-Asaoti(Palwal) new 60 km link along Western Peripheral Expressway was approved by the Haryana government in December 2018 and approval from the railway board is expected shortly. Extend it further to Noida International Airport, Jewar.
 Note: Hisar-Rajgarh link exists. Survey for Rajgarh-Taranagar-Sardarshar line and Sardarshar-Bhadra-Sirsa line were survey completed in 2015-16 km  
 Hisar Airport rail line: Existing Hisar-Jakhal line will be extended to Hisar airport as integrated transport hub, DPR will be ready soon (dec 2018 update.

 Chandigarh(Kalka)-Baddi line, 23.33 km route included in 2018 NR pink book. preliminary engineering-cum-traffic surveyed in 2010 LOA signed, state released 175 crore, 22 hectares land acquisition in progress (c. Nov 2017). IMT and fruit logistics hub at former HMT site in Pinjore.

 Manesar railway sliding project for Maruti Udyog
 other NR (Northern Railway) current survey (c. Nov 2017) and the construction status of important NR projects

 Announced projects (planned and/or being executed, c. Feb 2015) 
 Karnal-Yamuna Nagar Railway line, 
 Panipat-Meerut line, 104 km part of RORC and survey completed and included in 2018 NR pink book.
 Kaithal-Karnal Line
 Chandigarh-Adi Badri-Paonta Sahib line, surveyed completed in 2012, to expedite better to route it from a fork on Bilaspur (under-survey Yamunanagar-Chandgarh line) to Khizrabad to Paonta Sahib. 
 Jakhal-Ratia-Fatehabad Railway line, 
 Fatehabad-Mansa-Bhatinda Railway line, 
 Hisar-Sirsa via Agroha Fatehabad Railway line 93 km link sent to planning commission in 2013, Survey completed and already included in 2018 pink book. INR 40 lakh budget was allocated in 2019-20 union railway budget for the final detailed survey. A logistic hub rail sliding next to Hisar Aviation & Cargo Hub. 
 Sirsa-Ellanabad line announced in 2013 for military purpose.
 Rewari-Palwal via Bhiwadi Railway line, See below as part of NCR Regional Orbital Rail Corridor (RORC) and survey completed. Also see the proposed RORC Palwal-Khurja line. 
 Alwar-Narnaul-Mahendragarh-Charkhi Dadri line announced in 2014 by UPA govt but the suevry has no commenced until now.
 Sirsa-Ellenabad-Suratgarh line

 Previously surveyed (2010)
 Kaithal-Pundri-Karnal line, 92 km surveyed in 2010
 Patiala-Samana-Jakhal-Narwana line, 93 km surveyed in 2010
 Bahadurgarh-Jhajjar line, 40 km surveyed in 2010
 Yamunanagar-Kurukshetra-Patiala line, 174 km surveyed in 2010
 Rajgarh-Taranagar-Sardarshar line survey completed in 2015-16 as well as 100 km Sardarshar-Bhadra-Sirsa line, Sardarshar-Loonkaransar survey (to connect to mahajan firing range and Bikaner) was completed in 2014, Hisar-Rajgarh and Jaipur-Reengas-Churu lines already exist.

Under consideration projects
Under consideration for future inclusion, not yet approved, not yet surveyed
 Bilaspur-Paonta Sahib line (to connect proposed Chandigan-Yamunanagr line to Paonta Sahib), to connect to Chota Char Dham Railway
 Jhumpa Khurd-Bahal-Loharu line, short distance, this missing link will complete railway across western Haryana from Sirsa to Narnaul
 Jhumpa-Bhiwani line
 Narnaul-Charki Dadri-Meham line, NE-SW diagonal across Haryana
 Bhadra-Adampur-Fatehabad-Budhlada line to connect with already surveyed Sardarshahar-Sirsa line, 
 Hisar-Kanwari-Tosham-Kairu-Jui-Mahendragarh line, as western Haryana link
 Charkhi Dadri-Jhumpa Khurd line
 Charkhi Dadri-Loharu line
 Yamunanagar-Indri-Karnal line, 
 Fatehabad-Uklana line (to connect with proposed Uklana-Narwana line), for direct link across north Haryana from Sirsa to Chandigarh
 Jind-Barwala-Agroha-Adampur line, 
 Karnal-Jind-Hansi-Kanwari-Tosham-Jhumpa line, note that Kaithal-Pundri-Karnal line (also needs further new link to Patra-Sangrur-Barnala-Faridkot) was surveyed in 2010
 Karnal-Deoband line, Mujaffarnagar-Deoband-Roorkee line is under construction which will connect Haryana to Haridwar
 Mujaffarnagar-Shamli-Panipat line, Mujaffarnagar-Deoband-Roorkee line is under construction which will connect Haryana to Haridwar
 Meerut-Sonipat line
 Hisar-Anupgarh line via Balsamand-Bhadra-Nohar-Ryanwali-Anupgarh route 
 Bawanikhera-Mahajan line via Gohana-Meham-Bawanikhera-Kanwari-Tosham-Siwani-Sahwa-Pallu-Mahajan-Anupgarh route
 Mandkola-Dhaulpur line via Mandkola-Hathin-Uttawar-Punhana-Barsana-Govardhan-Deeg-Bharatpur-Dhaulpur route from where it connects to existing Delhi-Dhaulpur-Gwalior-Nagpur route, also provides alternate route to Agra and Mathura.

Under construction projects
Pink book projects under construction as per live map in the citation:
 Hisar-Hansi-Rohtak line, Rohtak-Meham under construction with all land in possession of IR and will be completed by June 2019, and Hansi-Hisar tender planning was underway in Nov 2017.

 Palwal-Firozepure Jhirka-Alwar line, via Palwal-Mandkola-Nuh-Bhadas-Firozepure Jhirka-Ootwar-Alwar, as per pink book.

NCR projects
 NCR Regional Orbital Rail Corridor (RORC)
 Panipat-Rohtak line, via Panipat-Gohana-Rohtak, exists. 
 Rohtak-Rewari line, via Rohtak-Jhajjar-Rewari, exists. 
 Rewari-Khurja line, via Rewari-Bhiwadi-Nuh-Palwal-Khurja, new rail line, survey completed. Nuh-Palwal section is also part of the separate Palwal-Nuh-Ferrozepur Jhirka-Alwar line already under construction as per the pink book. 
 Khurja-Meerut line, via Khurja-Bulandshahr-Hapur-Meerut, existing.  
 Meerut-Panipat line, new rail line, survey completed. It will cost INR2,200 crore. The construction will commence in year 2019.

 NCR Inner Regional Orbital Rail Corridor (IRORC)
 Sonepat-Bahadurgrah-Jhajjar line, new line.
 Jhajjar-Farukh Nagar-Gurgaon line, new line.
 Gurgaon-Faridabad line, new line.
 Faridabad-Dadri line, new line.
 Dadri-Ghaziabad line, existing line, also part of RRTS corridor.
 Ghaziabad-Kundali line via Baghpat, new line.

 NCR Counter Magnet City interconnectivity Projects
Hisar as CMG links 
Hisar-Patiala rail link: exists (a) Ukalana-Narwana link and Kaithal-CheekaGuhla-Samana link in Haryana or (b) Jakhal/Moonak-Patra-Samana link in Punjab as an alternate route

Hisar-Karnal-Ambala rail link: Missing links are (a) Uklana-Narwana link and Kaithal-Pundri-Karnal link (b) Hansi-Jind link (under survey) and (c) Jind-Karnal link

Hisar-Gwaliar rail link: exists except Bhopal-Beora-Ramganj-Jhalawar link which is being implementation and tenders were issued in 2014

Hisar-Jaipur-Kota-Bhopal rail link: exists except Bhopal-Beora-Ramganj-Jhalawar link which is being implementation and tenders were issued in 2014

Karnal and Ambala as CMG links (includes Patiala as CMG links)
Karnal-Dehradun rail link: Karnal-Yamunanagar missing links is under survey

Karnal-Bareilly rail link: Under survey Karnal-Yamunanagar links willprovide indirect route, the direct link Karnal-Shamli-Muzaffarnagar-Bijnor-Shahspur is missing, needs approval and will be of strategic importance to Rajasthan-Pithoragarh (Pakistan to China border) army movement, it will also directly connect Mahabharta religious city of Kurukshetra with the Char Dham rail network

Karnal-Jaipur rail link: exists via Rohtak-Rewari-Alwar

Karnal-Kota rail link: exists via Jaipur except the under construction rail link from Jhalawar to Bhopal (see Hisar Kota link link)

Gwaliar as CMG links (oncludes Bareilly and Kanpur as CMG) 
 All exist. There are existing Gwaliar-Jhansi-Kanpur line, Gwaliar-Agra-Breilly line and Kanpur-Unnao-Bareilly line.

Other future projects of interest
This is live rail map in citation.

Himachal Pradesh 
 New rail links in Himachal Pradesh 
 Nangal Dam-Talwara line, 83.74 km route included in 2018 pink book.
 Banopli-Bilaspur-Beri line, 63.1 km route included in 2018 pink book.
 Chadigarh(Kalka)-Baddi line, 33.23 km route included in 2018 pink book, under construction.
 Una-Hamirpur line, 50 km route included in 2018 pink book.
 New rail links from Himchal Pradesh to J&K
 Bhanupli–Leh line
 New rail links from Himachal Pradesh to Uttrakhand

Punjab
 New rail links in Punjab near Haryana Border
 Abohar-Fazilka line, 42.717 km route included in 2018 pink book.
 Chandigarh-Ludhiana line, 112 km route included in 2018 pink book.
 New rail links from Punjab to Himachal Pradesh
 Nangal Dam-Talwara line, 83.74 km route included in 2018 pink book.
 Banopli-Bilaspur-Beri line, 63.1 km route included in 2018 pink book.
 New rail links to J&K
 Jallandhar-Pathankot-Jammu-Tawi, 211.26 km route is included in 2018 NR pink book.

 New rail links from Punjab to Pakistan

Rajasthan
 Bhatinda-Dabwali-Hanumangarh-Pilibangan-Suratgarh line is operational and electrification work commenced in 2018-19 at the cost of INR350 crore.
 New rail links in Rajasthan near Haryana Border
 Sardarshahar
 Lunkaransar-Sardarshar-Taranagar-Sadulpur (Rajgarh) link
 Sardarshar-Lunkaransar line (82 km) survey was announced in 2013 to connect existing end points for strategic military requirements. In 2015 budget, additional INR9 lakh allocated for survey work by Railway minister.
 Sardarshar-Taranagar-Sadulpur (Rajgarh) line (100 km) survey was announced in 2015 to connect existing end points.
 Sardarshahar-Nohar-Sirsa line via Jingana-GudianaKhera-Arniawali-Bajekan (94 km) survey was announced in 2013 and cost estimates were prepared. In 2015 budget, additional INR14 lakh allocated for survey work by Railway minister.
 Sardarshahar-Suratgarh-Gajsinghpur line (115 km) survey was announced in 2015.
 Gajsinghpur (Pak border)-Padampur-Goluwala-Pilibanga-Rawatsar-Sahawa-Taranagar-Daderwa-Sadulpur(Rajgarh) line survey was announced in 2013 to connect existing end points for strategic military requirements In 2015 budget, additional INR44 lakh allocated for survey work by Railway minister.
 NeemKaThana(on Delhi-Rewari-Jaipur line)-Sikar-Salasar-Sujangarh line (150 km) survey was announced in 2013,
 Alwar-Behror-Narnaul-Charkhi Dadri line survey was announced in 2013 was pending approval for the financial vetting in 2015. No budget was allocated in 2015. Should be extended to Nokha-Phalodi (to Bikaner).
 Dausa-Gangapur line, 92.67 km route is included in 2018 NCR pink book. Will provide direct Delhi-Faridabad-Alwar-Dausa-Kota-Gwalior access by bypassing aipur on its west.
 Ratlam-Banswara-Dungarpur line, 176.47 km route is included in 2018 NCR pink book.
 Gauge conversion (all gauge conversion across India will be completed by March 2022)
 Jaipur-Reengus-Churu and Sikar-Loharu gauge conversion of 320.04 km route is included in 2018 NCR pink book.
 Suratpura-Hanumangarh-Sri Ganganagar gauge conversion of 240.95 km route is included in 2018 NCR pink book.
 Sadulpur-Bikaner and Ratangarh-Degana gauge conversion of 394.35 km route is included in 2018 NCR pink book.
 New rail links from Rajasthan to Madhya Pradesh
 Jhalawar-Biaora-Bhopal line tender was issued in 2014 for construction.
 Gauge conversion (all gauge conversion across India will be completed by March 2022)
 Jaipur-Bhopal existing link: Gwaliar-Sheopur-Kota line gauge conversion of 284 km route is included in 2018 NCR pink book. 
 Agra-Kota-Ujjain-Khandwa-Akola-Washim existing link: Gangapur, Sawai Madhopur Dhaulpur-Sirmuttra-Gangapur line gauge conversion of 144.6 km route is included in 2018 NCR pink book.
 New rail links from Rajasthan to Gujrat and Maharashtra

UP
 New rail links in UP near Haryana Border
 Karnal-Haridwar: Deoband-Roorkee line, 27.45 km route included in 2018 pink book, Karnal to Deoband is the missing link.
 Mathura-Vrindavan line, 11 km route is included in 2018 NCR pink book.
 New rail links from UP to Nepal

Uttrakhand
 New rail links in Uttrakhand near Haryana Border
 Char Dham Railway
 New rail links from Uttrakhand to Nepal
 Nainital-Pithoragarh-Nepal line

NCR CMG connectivity
 Complimentary NCR CMG (counter Magnet City) Interconnectivity NH (National Highways) projects
 From Hisar:
 Hisar-Jaipur: Hisar-Kaimri-Isharwal and Gokulpura-RampuraBeri-Pilani and Chirawa-Chanana-Ponkh-Chala(or Neem Ka Thana) are missing links
 Hisar-kota: Ponkh-Khatu-Renwal and Jobner-Mahlan-Shankarpura-Choru-Chosla, Chandser (NH16)-Tordi(NH37A) and Todraisingh-Botunda-NH52(Deoli) are missing links
 Hisar-Patiala: Barwala-Surbara-Narwana, Hatho-Kolekhan-Guhna-Attela-Bhuna-Cheeka-Panjola is the missing link
 Hisar-Ambala: Barwala-Uchana-Titram Kaithal the missing link
 Hisar-Karnal: NH9-Dhansu-Chanot-Masudpur-Narnaund is missing link (newly constructed SH/MDR can be converted to NH)
 Hisar-Dehradun: NH8-Newal-Gangoh(needs new Yamuna bridge)-Ambheta-Saharanpur
 Hisar-Bareilly: Barfeilly-Chandausi-Pawasa-Dhawarsi-Siyana-Kuchesar-Babugarh-Hapur(new northern bypass), Rasoolpur Dhaulri-Doula(NH334B)-Goripur and SOnepat-Farmanah-LakhanMajra-Bass-BhatolJattan-Pal-ki-Dhani(NH12)-Bhatla(NH17)-Niyana-Shikarpur-NH9 (Radha Soami Satsang Beas Hisar-1) are missing direct link
 Hisar-Kanpur: Kanpur(NH19)-Rura-Dibiyapur(NH234)-Bakewar, Rewari-Tupkara-Nuh-Ujina-Hodal, Mandola-Kosli-Palhawas-Pataudi-Taoru, Dohki(NH17)-Rajgarh(NH709)-Dinod-Tosham(NH17)-Kanwari-Hisar are missing link
 Hisar-Gwalior: Kanina(NH24)-Palri(NH17)-Jui(NH709)-Kairu(NH12)-Isharwal(NH12)is missing link
 HisarAirport-Delhi Airport: Hisar-Kanwari-Tigrana-Bamla-Matenhail-Bhindawas-Silana(NH35)-Kiloi(NH15A)-Badli-IGI Airport GREENFIELD EXPESSWAY is missing link (under plan?) Take note of greenfield and direct route alignment that also connects unconnected Tehsils and various Bird Sanctuaries in Matenhail, Bindhawas, Khaparwas, Macchrauli, etc.
 From Karnal (includes Ambala and Patiala):
 Ambala-Jaipur-kota: Ambala-Rehra-CharkhiDadri greenfield NH route has been announced as NH and industrial corridor, Nizampur(Narnaul)-Patan-Shahpur is the missing link
 Ambala-Dehradun:
 Ambala-Bareilly: Shamli-Khatoli-Hastinapur-Joya-Kindarki-Shahbad-Bareilly is missing NH link
 Ambala-Kanpur: Samalkha-Baraut-Hapur-Meerut-Kahangirabad-Dibai-Bahediya-Aliganj-Chibbramau-Talgram-Kakaaan-Shivli-Kanpur
 Ambala-Gwalior: Nih-Ujina-Uttawar-Punhana-Kaman is missing link
Kaithal-Pundri-Karnal
 Karnal-Haridwar: Deoband-Roorkee line, 27.45 km route included in 2018 pink book, Karnal to Deoband is the missing link.

 From Barilly:
 Barilly-Jaipur-Kota: Sirmathura-Mandrayal-Chancheri-Khandar-NJ30-to-Khatoli 
 Barilly-Dehradun: Rampur-Dilari-Sahaspur and Nagina-Nazibabad-Roorkee are missing link
 Barilly-Kanpur: Farukhabad-Pihan-Sauna-Rapra-Pravea-HarodiaBholapur-Kandharpur
 Barilly-Gwalior: Badaun-Ganj Dundwara-Sakot-Shikohabad-Porsa-Pariksha-Gwalior is missing NH link

 From Kanpur:
 Kanpur-Jaipur-Kota: Fatehabad (Agra)-Khairgrah-Uchena is missing link
 Kanpur—Kota: Hwaliar-Tentara and Lakshmanpura-Sheopur are missing link
 Kanpur-Gwalior: Kuthond-Madhogarh-Mihona-Mau is missing link

National freight corridors
Diamond Quadrilateral High-speed rail network, Eastern Dedicated Freight Corridor (72 km) and Western Dedicated Freight Corridor (177 km) pass through Haryana.

Special rail

UNESCO Heritage rails
 UNESCO World Heritage Kalka Shimla Railway with vistadome.

Tourist circuit rail
Sri Krishna circuit on Vrindavan-Mathura-Govardhan-Barsana-Kurukshetra route and Hemu heritage circuit on Delhi-Rewari-Madhogarh-Panipat route. Other potential circuits are Prithviraj circuit on Faridabad(Surajkund)-Taraori-Asigarh Fort(Hansi)-Hisar-Tosham route, Haryana Buddha circuit on Hisar(ashoka pillar in mosque in Firoz Shah Palace Complex)-Agroha Mound-Fatehabad(Ashoka lat in mosque)-Kurukshetra(Buddha satupa on main sarovar)-Topra-Sugh-Chaneti.

Luxury rail
Luxury rail in Haryana are the Delhi-Rewari Fairy Queen Heritage Train and the proposed Delhi-Rewari-Madhogarh Heritage Rail Circuit.

High-speed rail

Semi-High Speed rail: 160-200 km
Delhi-Agra and Delhi-Chandigarh routes will be converted to the average speed of 160–200 km per hour. The project was conceived in 2014.

Delhi-Chandigarh semi high speed rail corridor with 200 km/hr via Ambala Cantt and Panipat will commence construction work in 2019. Cost of this corridor 11,218 crore.

Rapid Rail Transport System (RRTS)

The under-construction Delhi-Alwar RRTS and Delhi-Sonepat-Panipat RRTS will pass through Haryana. In 2017 December, National Capital Region Transport Corporation signed agreements with Administrador de Infraestructuras Ferroviarias (Spain's state-owned company) and Société nationale des chemins de fer français (France's state-owned company) to cooperate on the development of rapid rail smart projects, including Delhi-Meerut Smart Line, Delhi-Panipat Smart Line and Delhi-Alwar Smart Line have been prioritised for implementation in the first phase of NCR RRTS where these three lines will operate from Sarai Kale Khan in Delhi. Designed with 180 km/h design speed, 160 km/h operational speed, and 100 km/h average speed, of six-car trains carrying 1,154 passengers running every 5 to 10 minutes on either underground or elevated point-to-point tracks where passengers will not have to change trains. 35-40% funding will be equity from Centre and state governments and the remaining 60% will come from multilateral funding agencies.

 Delhi-Alwar RRTS: Delhi-Alwar line will have 19 stations, 9 underground stations from ISBT Kashmere Gate to Kherki Daula and 10 elevated stations on 124.5 km route.
 Delhi-Sonipat RRTS: INR 30,000 crore Delhi-Panipat Smart Line and 180.5 km will cost around Rs 37,539 crore Delhi-Alwar Smart Line are awaiting DPR approval, construction to commence by the end of 2018 and completed before 2025. Cost of this corridor is 30,000 crore. At four major stops in Panipat: Panipat Depot, Panipat North, Panipat South and Samalkha.
 Delhi-Rohtak-Hisar RRTS

High Speed 200-500 km/h rail

Delhi-Mumbai high-speed rail and Delhi–Amritsar high-speed rail of Diamond Quadrilateral High-speed rail network via Sohna-Rewari-Narnaul will pass through Haryana. The Ministry of Railways has established the National High-Speed Rail Corporation Limited as a government company on 12 February 2016 to promote high-speed rail corridors. The Indian Ministry of Railways' white-paper "Vision 2020", envisages the implementation of regional high-speed rail projects to provide services at 250–350 km/h, and planning for corridors connecting commercial, tourist, and pilgrimage hubs. Six corridors have been identified for technical studies on setting up of high-speed elevated rail corridors, including the following 2 passing through Haryana:
 Delhi–Chandigarh–Amritsar: This 458 km corridor costing 1 lakh crore has been approved by the railway board and construction will commence in year 2020. The route alignment is Delhi-Panipat-Ambala-Chandigarh-Ludhiana-Jalandhar-Amritsar
 Delhi-Agra-Lucknow-Varanasi-Patna

Personal Rail Transport (PRT) Metrino
Dhaula Kuan-Gurugram-Manesar Personal rapid transit, also called Metrino, was initiated in Dec 2017 by the Government of India by inviting fresh expression of interest from the providers.

Metro train

Current
 Faridabad and Ballabgarh: Violet Line (Delhi Metro)
 Bahadurgarh: Green Line (Delhi Metro)
 Gurugram: Yellow Line (Delhi Metro) and Rapid Metro Gurgaon

Proposed
 Chandigarh and Panchkula: Chandigarh Metro (proposed)
 Sonipat Metro - extension Red Line (Delhi Metro): In June 2017, the Government of Haryana's cabinet approved the investment of INR 968.20 (US$150 million), as its share on the 80:20 equity ratio with the union government, for the  extension of Delhi Metro from the existing Rithala metro station to Sonipat via Bawana with three elevated stations at Sector 5 of Narela in Delhi, on Delhi border at Kundli Industrial Area and Nathupur Industrial Area in Sonipat, which are planned to be built starting from April 2018 and to be completed by March 2022 as part of the Phase IV. There are plans to further extend this line deeper into the Sonipat city (via Rajiv Gandhi Education City) and beyond to Murthal (Deenbandhu Chhotu Ram University of Science and Technology) in the future.
 Bahadurgarh Metro - Green Line extension:  An extension of Green Line from Mundka along the NH 9 will under construction and on schedule to be completed by December 2017 (as of June 2017).
 Rohtak Metro - Green Line extension:  An extension of Green Line from Bahadurgarh, proposed only and not yet approved as of July 2017.
 Kharkhoda Metro - Red Line extension: From the existing Rithala metro station to the new stations in Rohini and Bawana industrial area, to Kharkhoda in Haryana, and up to Rohtak via Sisana as second line to Rohtak. As of July 2017, proposed only and not yet approved.
 Jhajjar Metro - Blue Line extension: from existing Blue line to Najafgarh and Kharkari in Delhi to Badli in Haryana on Jhajjar border (not to be confused with Badli Industrial area of Delhi in Sonipat border) and Jhajjar city in Haryana. As of July 2017, proposed only and not yet approved.
 Dwarka - AIIMS Bhadsa - Farukh Nagar - Gurugram Blue Line extension: from the existing Blue line at Dwarka to  AIIMS Jhajjar at Badsha, Farukh Nagar and Gurugram in Haryana. As of July 2017, proposed only and not yet approved.
 Dwarka-Gurugram - Blue Line and Orange Line Airport Express extension: As second connection via Kapashera and Bijwasan on Haryana border. To complete the metro ring around Gurugram, a proposal was prepared in November 2017 for the two missing routes, (a) for Blue Line (Delhi Metro) "HUDA City Centre metro station" to Dwarka Sector 21 metro station (via Sector-45, Sector-46, Sector-47, Subhash Chawk, Bahrampur, Hero Honda Cross, Udhyog Vihar-6, Sector-37 Pataudi road, Sector-10 Basai road, Sector-9 Dhankot railway station, Sector-7, HUDA Road, Sector-4/5, Ashok Vihar, Palam Vihar, Palam Vihar Sector-1, Palam Vihar Sector-23, Sector-111, Bijwasan border, Bijwasan railway station and  Barthal), (b) from HUDA City Centre metro station to Gurgaon railway station (via Sector-45, Sector-46, Sector-47, Subhash Chawk, Rajiv Chawk, HUDA road and Sector-4/5). 
 Gurugram - Manesar Yellow Line extension:  An extension of the existing yellow line at Gurugram to Manesar Industrial township in the west. In May 2017, a joint study by HUDA and Haryana Town and Planning found the proposal to be technically and financially viable and Detailed Project Report is being prepared for the approval.
 Balramgrah (Faridabad) - Palwal Violet Line extension: From existing Balramgarh (Ballabhgarh) to Palwal district headquarters. As of July 2017, proposed only and not yet approved.

Multimodel Transit Centres (MMTC) 
Five multimodel transit centres are being built, each one along the Delhi Western Peripheral Expressway (WPE) in the vicinity of railway stations, metro, RRTS and major national highways. These MMTCs will be located at:
 Sonipat: Kundli MMTS between Rajiv Gandhi Education City RRTS station and WPE interchange, 
 Bahadurgarh MMTS between Bahadurgarh bus stand and metro station, 
 Ballabhgarh MMTS between Ballabhgarh Metro Station, bus stand and railway station, 
 Panchagaon Chowk MMTS between proposed metro station and Gurugram RRTS station, and 
 Kherki Daula MMTS near proposed metro station and Delhi-Alwar RRTS station and bus stand on the junction of Chhapra and Naihati villages.

Multimodel logistics hubs 
 IMLH Nangal Choudhary  In Mahendragarh district, with US$3.3 billion or INR86,000 crore the initial investment the Integrated Multimodel Logistics Hub at Nangal Choudhary is part of  Delhi–Mumbai Industrial Corridor Project (DMIC).
 IMT Kundli In Sonepat district, is part of  Delhi–Mumbai Industrial Corridor Project (DMIC) on Western Dedicated Freight Corridor (WDFC) and also located in the influence zone of the Amritsar Delhi Kolkata Industrial Corridor (ADKIC) on Eastern Dedicated Freight Corridor (EDFC).
 IMT Manesar In Faridabad district, with more than US$10 billion already invested by 2017 is part of Delhi–Mumbai Industrial Corridor Project (DMIC) on Western Dedicated Freight Corridor (WDFC) and also located in the influence zone of the Amritsar Delhi Kolkata Industrial Corridor (ADKIC) on Eastern Dedicated Freight Corridor (EDFC).
 IMT Bawal In Rewari district, is a large industrial centre has been developed by the Haryana State Industrial and Infrastructure Development Corporation (HSIIDC). It is part of  Delhi–Mumbai Industrial Corridor Project (DMIC) on Western Dedicated Freight Corridor (WDFC) and also located in the influence zone of the Amritsar Delhi Kolkata Industrial Corridor (ADKIC) on Eastern Dedicated Freight Corridor (EDFC).

Issues 
Multiple issues include the lack of progress on announced projects, lack of comprehensive long-term transport needs analysis and planning, lack of funding, lack of connectivity, lack of integration with multimodel transport, lack of effective utilization of existing infrastructure such as integrated logistics and industrial hubs, land acquisition, etc.

See also 

 Zones and divisions of Indian Railways
 Airports in Haryana
 Highways & Exressways in Haryana
 Divisions of Haryana

References

External links 

 Multi-model transport network map of Haryana, created by Haryana Space Applications Centre, Hisar (HARSAC)
 Railway network of Haryana, created by HARSAC
 Indian Rail (IR), Official website
 Pink book
 North Western Railway zone (NWR), Official website
 Northern Railway zone (NR), Official website
 North Central Railway zone (NCR), Official website

Rail transport in Haryana
North Western Railway Zone
Northern Railway Zone
North Central Railway Zone
Haryana-related lists